"The Big Tall Wish" is episode twenty-seven of the American television anthology series The Twilight Zone, with an original score by Jerry Goldsmith. It originally aired on April 8, 1960 on CBS. This was one of a few Twilight Zone episodes to feature black actors in lead roles, a rarity for American television of the era.

Opening narration

Plot
Washed-up boxer Bolie Jackson spends time with his young friend Henry Temple before a comeback fight, the young son of Bolie's neighbor Frances. Henry says he's going to make "the biggest, tallest wish" for Bolie, who then departs for the fight. After Bolie injures his knuckles in a backstage argument, he proceeds with the fight anyway. He is knocked down and just about to be counted out, when suddenly, he magically switches places with the other boxer. Bolie is now standing over his vanquished opponent.

Bolie celebrates his victory, though he cannot understand what happened. He remembers being knocked down and has no memory of getting back up to win, nor can he figure out why his knuckles feel fine; he figures they must have only been bruised. His manager is stumped as to why Bolie thinks he was knocked down and explains that this did not happen.

Upon returning home, Henry has an explanation for what happened. Henry tells Bolie about the wish he made during the fight, and that it came true. Bolie cannot accept this. Henry warns him that the only way the wish can have its power is if you believe in it. If Bolie does not believe, the wish will not work. Bolie tells the boy that life does not work that way and that he has been wishing all his life and only has scars to show for it. Henry begs him to believe but Bolie insists he cannot. Suddenly, he is returned to the fight; he is down on the canvas. This time the referee finishes counting Bolie out.

Neither Bolie nor Henry have any memory of the alternate outcome. Henry remembers making the biggest wish he possibly could for Bolie, but since it didn't work he declares with resignation that he will not be making any more wishes. "There ain't no such thing as magic, is there?", he asks Bolie. "I guess not, Henry", Bolie replies sadly. "Or maybe...maybe there is magic. And maybe there's wishes, too. I guess the trouble is...I guess the trouble is there's not enough people around to believe."

Closing narration

Production notes
The all-black principal cast was groundbreaking for television in 1960. Said Rod Serling at the time (quoted in The Twilight Zone Companion by Marc Scott Zicree):

A few other Twilight Zones followed the example of this episode and cast black actors in significant roles, including the pastor in "I Am the Night—Color Me Black", with Ivan Dixon, a child in the mall in "The Night of the Meek", and the electrician in "The Brain Center at Whipple's". These inclusions, though seemingly insignificant by modern standards, were so revolutionary at the time that The Twilight Zone was awarded the Unity Award for Outstanding Contributions to Better Race Relations in 1961.

Originally cast in the lead role was champion boxer Archie Moore, who later exclaimed, "Man, I was in the Twilight Zone!" when describing the punch delivered by his opponent Yvon Durelle.

This is one of several episodes from season one where some broadcast prints have the opening title sequence replaced with that of season two. This was done during the summer of 1961 to help the season one shows fit in with the new look the show had taken during the following season.

The hallway shown in this episode is also used in "Mr. Bevis", episode 33, but slightly altered. However, the door and stair railings remain the same.

The boxing match takes place at "St. Nick's Arena", which was the name of a boxing arena in New York City, the St. Nicholas Rink.

References

Further reading
Zircee, Marc Scott: The Twilight Zone Companion.  Sillman-James Press, 1982 (second edition)
DeVoe, Bill. (2008). Trivia from The Twilight Zone. Albany, GA: Bear Manor Media. 
Grams, Martin. (2008). The Twilight Zone: Unlocking the Door to a Television Classic. Churchville, MD: OTR Publishing.

External links

1960 American television episodes
The Twilight Zone (1959 TV series season 1) episodes
Boxing mass media
Television episodes written by Rod Serling